Ilanga is a genus of sea snails, marine gastropod mollusks in the family Solariellidae.

Species
Species within the genus Ilanga include:

 Ilanga agulhaensis (Thiele, 1925)
 Ilanga aquamarina (Melvill, 1909)
 Ilanga bicarinata (A. Adams & Reeve, 1850)
 Ilanga biradiatula (Martens, 1902)
 Ilanga boreia Vilvens & S. T. Williams, 2020
 Ilanga comes Vilvens & S. T. Williams, 2020
 Ilanga corrineae Vilvens & S. T. Williams, 2020
 Ilanga cosmia Vilvens & S. T. Williams, 2020
 Ilanga discus Herbert, 1987
 Ilanga dongshaensis Vilvens & S. T. Williams, 2020
 Ilanga euryomphalos Vilvens & S. T. Williams, 2020
 Ilanga eurystoma Vilvens & S. T. Williams, 2020
 Ilanga fulgens (Dall, 1907)
 Ilanga furtiva Herbert, 1987
 Ilanga gotoi (Poppe, Tagaro & Dekker, 2006)
 Ilanga gratiosa (Thiele, 1925)
 Ilanga harrytaylori Vilvens & S. T. Williams, 2020
 Ilanga helicoides Vilvens & S. T. Williams, 2020
 Ilanga herberti Vilvens & S. T. Williams, 2020
 Ilanga humillima (Thiele, 1925)
 Ilanga illustris (Sturany, 1904)
 Ilanga impolita Herbert, 1987
 Ilanga incisura (Melvill, 1909)
 Ilanga kilburni Herbert, 1987
 Ilanga konos (Vilvens, 2009)
 Ilanga laevissima (Martens, 1881)
 Ilanga lauensis Vilvens & S. T. Williams, 2020
 Ilanga lirellata Herbert, 1987
 Ilanga maculicincta Herbert, 1987
 Ilanga mesembrine Vilvens & S. T. Williams, 2020
 Ilanga millardi Herbert, 1987
 Ilanga navakaensis (Ladd, 1982)
 Ilanga norfolkensis (B. A. Marshall, 1999)
 Ilanga oxeia Vilvens & S. T. Williams, 2020
 Ilanga philia Vilvens & S. T. Williams, 2020
 Ilanga platypeza Herbert, 1987
 Ilanga polita Herbert, 1987
 Ilanga polygramma Vilvens & S. T. Williams, 2020
 Ilanga rhyssomphala Herbert, 1987
 Ilanga stephanophora Vilvens & S. T. Williams, 2020
 Ilanga whitechurchi (Turton, 1932)

Species brought into synonymy
 Ilanga carinata Verrill, A.E., 1882: synonym of Solariella obscura (Couthouy, J.P., 1838)
 Ilanga nyssonoides "Kuroda, T. MS" Okutani, T.A., 1964 (nomen nudum): synonym of Solariella tenuicollaris Golikov, A.N. & B.I. Sirenko, 1998
 Ilanga planula Verrill, A.E., 1882: synonym of Solariella obscura (Couthouy, J.P., 1838)
 Ilanga undata (G.B. Sowerby, 1870): synonym of Ilanga bicarinata bicarinata (A. Adams & Reeve, 1850)

References

Notes
 Herbert, D.G. (1987). Revision of the Solariellinae (Mollusca: Prosobranchia: Trochidae) in southern Africa. Annals of the Natal Museum, 28(2): 283-382.
 S. Williams: Ilanga

External links
 Vilvens C. & Williams S.T. (2020). New species of Ilanga (Gastropoda: Trochoidea: Solariellidae) from the Indo-West Pacific. Zootaxa. 4732(2): 201-257

 
Solariellidae
Gastropod genera